Reginald Cherry (3 October 1901 – 22 December 1938) was a New Zealand cricketer. He played 23 first-class matches for Otago between 1919 and 1932.

Born in England, Cherry came to New Zealand with his family in 1914 and was educated at Dunedin Technical College. He worked as a commercial traveller for the New Zealand company Sargood Son and Ewen. He died when he developed complications after a minor operation, just a few days after top-scoring for his club in a senior cricket match in Dunedin. He left a widow but no children.

References

External links
 

1901 births
1938 deaths
New Zealand cricketers
Otago cricketers
People from Lambeth
Cricketers from Greater London